Djed i baka se rastaju is a 1996 Croatian film directed by Zvonimir Ilijić.

External links
 

1996 films
Croatian drama films
1990s Croatian-language films